Borio Assembly constituency is an assembly constituency in  the Indian state of Jharkhand. Borio was a part of Santhal Pargana district in undivided Bihar but is now part of the Sahibganj district.

Overview
Borio Assembly constituency covers: Borio and Taljhari Police Stations in Sahebganj district and Boarijor Police Station (excluding Rajabhita, Kero, Kairasol, Bara Telo and Barapipra gram panchayats) in Godda district.

This seat is reserved for Scheduled Tribes.

Borio Assembly constituency is part of Rajmahal (Lok Sabha constituency).

Members of Legislative Assembly 
2005: Tala Marandi, Bharatiya Janata Party.
2009: Lobin Hembrom, Jharkhand Mukti Morcha
2014: Tala Marandi, Bharatiya Janata Party
2019: Lobin Hembrom, Jharkhand Mukti Morcha

Election Results

2019

See also
Vidhan Sabha
List of states of India by type of legislature
Borio (community development block)
Taljhari
Boarijore

References

Assembly constituencies of Jharkhand